is a subway station on the Tokyo Metro Fukutoshin Line, in Shinjuku, Tokyo, Japan, operated by the Tokyo subway operator Tokyo Metro. Its station number is F-11. The station opened on June 14, 2008.

Lines
The station lies 14.6 km from Wakoshi.

Station layout
The station has one underground island platform located on the third basement ("B3F") level, serving two tracks.

Platforms

History
The station opened on 14 June 2008 with the opening of the Fukutoshin Line from Ikebukuro to Shibuya.

Passenger statistics
In fiscal 2013, the station was the 105th-busiest on the Tokyo Metro network with an average of 32,380 passengers daily. The passenger statistics for previous years are as shown below.

Surrounding area
 Toyama area
 Ōkubo area
 Totsuka (Waseda) and Takadanobaba area
 Toyama Park
 Shinjuku Sports Center
 Gakushuin Women's College, a private school
 Gakushuin Girls' Junior and Senior High School, a private school
 Toyama High School, a public school
 Nishi-Waseda Junior High School, a public school
 Waseda University School of Science and Engineering, Nishi-Waseda Campus in Ōkubo

See also
 List of railway stations in Japan

References

External links

 

Railway stations in Tokyo
Railway stations in Japan opened in 2008
Tokyo Metro Fukutoshin Line
Stations of Tokyo Metro